Memon may refer to:

Ethnic group and language
 Memon people, Sunni Muslim community in Gujarat, India and Sindh, Pakistan
 Memons (Kathiawar)
 Kutchi Memon, from Kutch, Gujarat
 Kutchi Memons in Bombay
 Bantva Memons, from Bantva, Gujarat
 Sindhi Memon
 Memons in South Africa
 Memons in Sri Lanka

 Memoni language, the language of Memon people historically associated with Kathiawar, Gujarat, India

People with the surname
 Abdul Jalil Memon (born 1970), Pakistani agriculturist and politician
 Jan Muhammad A. Memon (born 1949), Pakistani medical professional and educationist
 Marvi Memon (born 1972), Pakistani politician
 Muhammad Umar Memon (born 1939), Pakistani literature scholar, translator, poet, and writer
 Nasrullah Memon (born 1978), Pakistani cricketer
 Nisar Memon (born 1942), Pakistani politician
 Nasir Memon, American computer scientist
 Sattar Memon (born 1947), Indian physician and author
 Sharjeel Memon, Pakistani politician
 Sirajul Haq Memon (1933–2013), Pakistani writer and scholar
 Saud Memon (1963–2007), Pakistani businessman
 Tiger Memon (born 1960), Indian gangster
 Yakub Memon (1962–2015), Indian gangster

See also
 
 Momin (disambiguation)

Language and nationality disambiguation pages